Alain "Bam-Bam" Bélanger (born January 18, 1956) was a Canadian professional hockey player. He played 9 games with the Toronto Maple Leafs of the National Hockey League during the 1977–78 season, recording one assist. The next two seasons, he played in the American Hockey League with the New Brunswick Hawks, racking up 12 goals and 40 points in 76 games. He then retired for two years before returning for the 1982–83 season to play with the Sherbrooke Jets; however, he accrued no points in 21 games.

Career statistics

Regular season and playoffs

International

References

External links
 

1956 births
Living people
Calgary Cowboys draft picks
Canadian ice hockey right wingers
Dallas Black Hawks players
French Quebecers
Ice hockey people from Quebec
New Brunswick Hawks players
People from Chaudière-Appalaches
Sherbrooke Castors players
Sherbrooke Jets players
Toronto Maple Leafs draft picks
Toronto Maple Leafs players